Li Ying  (born ) is a former Chinese female volleyball player, who played as an opposite hitter in Tianjin women's volleyball team.

At the 2014 Asian Women's Club Volleyball Championship with Tianjin Bohai Bank she won the silver medal and was awarded as the best opposite spiker. 
On club level she played with Tianjin Volleyball in 2015-16.

Clubs
  Tianjin women's volleyball team (2009–2018)

References

External links
 Profile in 2012 FIVB Women's Club World Championship squads

1988 births
Living people
Chinese women's volleyball players
Place of birth missing (living people)
Liberos
Opposite hitters
Outside hitters
21st-century Chinese women